The Shmarjet helmet was a helmet of Illyrian origin worn by the historical Illyrians and the Veneti. It was favored especially by the Iapodes. It had two varieties, one with a wicker base and one with chain mail sewn together; the discs and studs were optional.

See also
Illyrians
Ancient Warfare

References

Bibliography

Ancient helmets
Illyrian warfare